Alhassan A. Kamara (born 13 January 1993), commonly known as Crespo, is a retired Sierra Leonean footballer.

Career
Kamara started his career with FC Kallon and joined Bodens BK, competing in Division 1 Norra, on 29 July 2011. He scored five goals in 10 games during his five months on loan at Boden. The striker signed a contract on 5 October 2011 with AIK.

During the first half of the 2012 season, he made 11 appearances for AIK. After the summer he was loaned out to Örebro SK, where he made four goal in eight appearances. On 24 January 2013 it was announced that he again was loaned to Örebro SK, for the rest of 2013. After the season Örebro SK decided to buy him from AIK, where he struggled to make an impact after failing to score in fourteen league appearances.

After getting injured early in the 2014 season, Kamara scored his first goal on 9 August against Mjällby AIF. He then proceeded to score, ending the season with 14 goals in the 12 last games despite often being substituted off in the second half (he played 90 minutes in 7 out of 19 games). He averaged one goal every 65 minutes in the last 12 games of the season, finishing with a hat trick in 7 minutes against BK Häcken.

On 2 June 2012 he made his senior international debut for Sierra Leone in a 2014 FIFA World Cup qualification game against Cape Verde.

On 2 September 2018, Greek Super League club Panetolikos officially announced the signing of Sierra Leonean international Alhassan Kamara Crespo until the end of 2019-20 season. The 25-year-old striker was recently released from Häcken, after two successful seasons at the Swedish Allsvenskan.

After a spell with IFK Värnamo, Kamara announced his retirement from football on 23 September 2021 after several years of problems with a knee injury.

Career statistics

References

External links

1993 births
Living people
Sierra Leonean Muslims
Association football forwards
Sierra Leonean footballers
Sierra Leonean expatriate footballers
Sierra Leone international footballers
AIK Fotboll players
F.C. Kallon players
Bodens BK players
Örebro SK players
BK Häcken players
Panetolikos F.C. players
Halmstads BK players
IFK Värnamo players
Allsvenskan players
Superettan players
Ettan Fotboll players
Super League Greece players
Expatriate footballers in Sweden
Expatriate footballers in Greece
Sierra Leonean expatriate sportspeople in Sweden
Sierra Leonean expatriate sportspeople in Greece